A list of music videos by American musician, singer and record producer "Weird Al" Yankovic.

Music videos

Awards and nominations

See also
"Weird Al" Yankovic: The Videos
"Weird Al" Yankovic: The Ultimate Video Collection

References

Sources

External links
 

Videographies of American artists
"Weird Al" Yankovic video albums